Borbo liana, the Evans' scarce swift, is a butterfly in the family Hesperiidae. It is found in Sierra Leone.

References

Butterflies described in 1937
Hesperiinae